Arecont Vision is a company based in Glendale, California. The company manufactures video surveillance products. In mid-2018, it went through Chapter 11 bankruptcy and was later acquired by Costar Technologies.

History 

Arecont Vision Holdings, LLC was founded in 2003 by Michael Kaplinsky and Vladimir Berezin in Southern California.

Costar Acquisition

The original company was acquired by Costar Technologies, Inc. (OTC Markets: CSTI), a Texas-based manufacturer of video surveillance and machine vision products, following a reorganization and Chapter 11 bankruptcy proceedings. The purchase price was reported as $11.25 million in cash. 

The original company was closed, and Arecont Vision Costar, LLC launched in July 2018 as an operating division of Costar. In the aftermath of the Costar acquisition, 10 percent of Arecont's workforce was made redundant in early 2019.

References 

Security companies of the United States
Technology companies established in 2003
Companies based in Glendale, California
Video surveillance companies